The planning horizon is the amount of time an organization will look into the future when preparing a strategic plan. Many commercial companies use a five-year planning horizon, however a general Planning horizon is around one year. Other organizations such as the Forestry Commission in the UK have to use a much longer planning horizon to form effective plans.

In manufacturing, a planning horizon is a future time period during which departments that support production will plan production work and determine material requirements.

In economics, a planning horizon is the length of time an individual plans ahead. It's important in the quest for total value, as opposed to short term pleasure consumption.

See also 
 Time horizon

Business terms
Strategic management
Production planning